Thomas Howard, 3rd Duke of Norfolk,  (1473 – 25 August 1554) was a prominent English politician and nobleman of the Tudor era. He was an uncle of two of the wives of King Henry VIII, Anne Boleyn and Catherine Howard, both of whom were beheaded, and played a major role in the machinations affecting these royal marriages. After falling from favour in 1546, he was stripped of his Dukedom and imprisoned in the Tower of London, avoiding execution when Henry VIII died on 28 January 1547.

He was released on the accession of the Roman Catholic queen, Mary I, whom he aided in securing her throne, thus setting the stage for tensions between his Catholic family and the Protestant royal line that would be continued by Mary I's half-sister, Elizabeth I.

Early life
Thomas was the son of Thomas Howard, 2nd Duke of Norfolk (1443–1524), by his first wife, Elizabeth Tilney (died 1497), the daughter of Sir Frederick Tilney and widow of Sir Humphrey Bourchier.  He was descended in the female line from Thomas of Brotherton, 1st Earl of Norfolk, the sixth son of King Edward I of England. In 1485, both his father and his grandfather, John Howard, 1st Duke of Norfolk, had fought for the Yorkist king, Richard III, at the Battle of Bosworth, in which his grandfather was killed, thus bringing the Tudor king, Henry VII, to the throne. Due to their allegiance to the losing side, most of the Howard family's titles became forfeit.

Howard was an able soldier, and was often employed in military operations. In 1497, he served in a campaign against the Scots under the command of his father, who knighted him on 30 September 1497. He was made a Knight of the Garter after the accession of King Henry VIII, and became the King's close companion, with lodgings at court. On 4 May 1513, he was appointed Lord Admiral, and on 9 September, he helped to defeat the Scots at the Battle of Flodden. His first wife, Anne of York, died in 1511, and early in 1513, Howard married Lady Elizabeth Stafford, the daughter of Edward Stafford, 3rd Duke of Buckingham and Lady Eleanor Percy, the daughter of Henry Percy, 4th Earl of Northumberland.

On 1 February 1514, Howard's father, then Earl of Surrey, was created Duke of Norfolk, and by letters patent issued on the same day, Thomas Howard was created Earl of Surrey for life. Over the next few years, he served King Henry VIII in a variety of ways. In September 1514, he escorted the King's sister Mary to France for her forthcoming marriage to King Louis XII of France. In 1517, he quelled a May Day riot in London with the use of soldiers.

On 10 March 1520, Howard was appointed Lord Deputy of Ireland. By July 1520, he entered upon the thankless task of endeavouring to keep Ireland in order. His letters contain accounts of attempts to pacify the rival factions of the Earl of Kildare and the Earl of Ormonde, and are full of demands for more money and troops.

At the end of 1521, Howard was recalled from Ireland to take command of the English fleet in naval operations against France. His ships were ill-provisioned, and his warfare consisted of a series of raids upon the French coast for the purpose of inflicting all the damage possible. When he abandoned the siege of Brest, he left Vice-Admiral William FitzWilliam on station to blockade the port. The English navy patrolled the coast of Brittany for the next three months, but was unable to score a decisive victory with their Spanish allies. In July 1522, Howard had burned Morlaix, in September, he had laid waste the country around Boulogne, spreading devastation on every side until the winter brought back the fleet to England. The sea patrol was abandoned with little achieved.

Rise to power
On 4 December 1522, Thomas Howard was made Lord Treasurer upon his father's resignation of the office, and on 21 May 1524, he succeeded his father as Duke of Norfolk. His liking for war brought him into conflict with Cardinal Thomas Wolsey, who preferred diplomacy in the conduct of foreign affairs. In 1523, Wolsey had secured to the Duke of Suffolk the reversion of the office of Earl Marshal by Howard's father, and in 1525, he was replaced as Lord Admiral by the Duke of Richmond. Finding himself pushed aside, the Duke of Norfolk spent considerable time away from court in 1525–1527 and 1528.

In the mid-1520s, Howard's niece, Anne Boleyn, had caught the eye of King Henry VIII, thereby reviving his political fortunes with his involvement in the King's attempt to annul his marriage to Catherine of Aragon. By 1529, matters of state were being increasingly handled by the Duke of Norfolk, the Duke of Suffolk, and the Boleyns, who pressed King Henry VIII to remove Cardinal Wolsey. In October, the King sent him and the Duke of Suffolk to obtain the great seal from the Cardinal. In November, Wolsey was arrested on a charge of treason, but died before trial. Howard benefited from Wolsey's fall, becoming the King's leading councillor and applying himself energetically in the King's efforts to find a way out of his marriage to Queen Catherine. His loyalty and service to King Henry VIII brought him ample rewards in the form of monastic lands in Norfolk and Suffolk, employment on diplomatic missions, and being named a knight of the French Order of St Michael in 1532 and Earl Marshal of England on 28 May 1533. In May 1536, when Henry VIII arrested his second wife, Anne Boleyn, Howard presided at the trial of his niece as Lord High Steward.

Thomas Howard's marriage to his second wife, Lady Elizabeth Stafford, which had apparently been mutually affectionate at first, deteriorated in 1527 when he took a mistress, Elizabeth Holland (died 1547/8), whom he installed in the Howard household. Lady Elizabeth formally separated from her husband in the 1530s. She claimed that in March 1534, the Duke of Norfolk 'locked me up in a chamber, [and] took away my jewels and apparel'. Howard then moved her to Redbourn, Hertfordshire, where she lived as an actual prisoner with a meagre annual allowance of only £200. She also claimed to have been physically maltreated by Howard and his household servants.

When the Pilgrimage of Grace broke out in Lincolnshire and the northern counties late in 1536, Howard shared command of the King's forces with the Earl of Shrewsbury, persuading the rebels to disperse by promising them a pardon and that Parliament would consider their grievances. However, when further rebellions erupted in January 1537, he carried out a policy of brutal retribution.

By 1539, the Duke of Norfolk was seriously challenging the religious reforms of the King's chief minister, Thomas Cromwell. In that year, King Henry VIII sought to have Parliament put an end to diversity in religious opinion. On 5 May, the House of Lords appointed a committee to consider questions of doctrine. Although he was not a member of the committee, on 16 May, Howard presented six conservative articles of religion to Parliament for consideration. On 30 May, the Six Articles and the penalties for failure to conform to them were enacted into law, and on 28 June, received royal assent.

On 29 June 1539, Thomas Howard, the Duke of Suffolk, and Thomas Cromwell dined with King Henry VIII as guests of the Archbishop of Canterbury, Thomas Cranmer. During a heated discussion about Cardinal Wolsey, Cromwell charged Thomas Howard with disloyalty who in turn called Cromwell a liar. Their mutual hostility was now out in the open. Cromwell inadvertently played into Howard's hands by taking the initiative in the King's marriage to Anne of Cleves. The King's disillusionment with Anne's physical appearance when he met her in January 1540, and his desire to have the marriage annulled after the wedding had taken place, gave Howard an opportunity to bring down his enemy, Cromwell. On 10 June 1540, Cromwell was arrested at a Privy Council meeting on charges of high treason, and the Duke of Norfolk personally 'tore the St George from his neck'. On 9 July 1540, King Henry's marriage to Anne of Cleves was annulled. On 28 July 1540, Cromwell was executed, and on the same day, the King wed the Duke's other niece, Catherine Howard, as his fifth wife. As a result of this marriage, for a time, Howard enjoyed political prominence, royal favour, and material rewards.

However, when Queen Catherine's premarital sexual indiscretions and her alleged adultery with Thomas Culpeper were revealed to King Henry VIII by Archbishop Cranmer, the King's wrath turned upon the Howard family, who were accused of concealing her misconduct. Queen Catherine was condemned by a bill of attainder and was later executed on 13 February 1542. Several other members of the Howard family were sent to the Tower, including the Duke of Norfolk's stepmother, the Dowager Duchess of Norfolk. However, the French ambassador Marillac wrote on 17 January 1542, that the Duke had not only escaped punishment, but had apparently been restored to his "full former credit and authority".

Thomas Howard was appointed Lieutenant-General north of the River Trent on 29 January 1541, and Captain-General in a campaign against the Scots in August 1542. In June 1543, he declared war on France in the King's name and was appointed Lieutenant-General of the army. During the campaign of May–October 1544, he besieged Montreuil, while King Henry VIII captured Boulogne, before returning home. Complaining of lack of provisions and munitions, Howard eventually raised the siege of Montreuil, and realizing that Boulogne could not realistically be held by the English for long, he left it garrisoned and withdrew to Calais, for which he was severely rebuked by the King.

Imprisonment and release
During the King's final years Edward Seymour, Earl of Hertford, and Henry VIII's last queen, Catherine Parr, both of whom favoured Protestantism, gained influence with the King while the conservative Duke of Norfolk became isolated politically. He attempted to form an alliance with the Seymours through a marriage between his widowed daughter, Mary Howard and Hertford's brother Thomas Seymour, but the effort was forestalled by the provocative conduct of his eldest son and heir, Henry Howard, Earl of Surrey, who had assumed the royal arms of Edward the Confessor as part of his personal heraldry. On 12 December 1546 both Thomas Howard and his son were arrested and sent to the Tower. On 24 December 1546, the elder Howard acknowledged that he had "concealed high treason, in keeping secret the false acts of my son, Henry Earl of Surrey, in using the arms of St. Edward the Confessor, which pertain only to kings", and offered his lands to the King. The Duke of Norfolk's family, including his estranged wife, his daughter Mary, and his mistress, Elizabeth Holland, all gave evidence against him. His son was beheaded on 19 January 1547, and on 27 January 1547, he was attainted by statute without trial. The dying King gave his assent to Howard's death by royal commissioners, and it was rumoured that he would be executed on the following day. He was saved by the King's death on 28 January and the council's decision not to inaugurate the new reign with bloodshed. His estates fell prey to the ruling clique in the reign of King Edward VI, for which he was later partly compensated by lands worth £1626 a year from Queen Mary I.

Howard remained in the Tower throughout the reign of Edward VI. He was released and pardoned by Queen Mary in 1553, and in Mary's first parliament (October–December 1553), his statutory attainder was declared void, thereby restoring him to the dukedom. He was appointed to the Privy Council, and presided as Lord High Steward at the trial of the Duke of Northumberland on 18 August. He was also restored to the office of Earl Marshal and officiated in that capacity at Mary's coronation on 1 October 1553. His last major service to the Crown was his command of the forces sent in early 1554 to put down Wyatt's rebellion, a group of disaffected gentlemen who opposed the Queen's projected marriage to Philip II of Spain, but his men fled before the enemy.

Marriage and progeny
Thomas Howard married twice:
First, a politically advantageous match, on 4 February 1494/95, he married Princess Anne of York (1475–1511), the fifth daughter of King Edward IV of England and Elizabeth Woodville, and the sister-in-law of King Henry VII. By Anne of York, he had four children, none of whom survived to adulthood.
Secondly, early in 1513, he married Lady Elizabeth Stafford, daughter of Edward Stafford, 3rd Duke of Buckingham, by his wife Lady Eleanor Percy, daughter of Henry Percy, 4th Earl of Northumberland. By Elizabeth, he had five children including:
Henry Howard, Earl of Surrey, (1516/7-1547), who married Frances de Vere, daughter of John de Vere, 15th Earl of Oxford, by whom he had two sons and three daughters, Thomas Howard, 4th Duke of Norfolk; Henry Howard, 1st Earl of Northampton; Katherine Howard, who married Henry Berkeley, 7th Baron Berkeley; Margaret Howard, who married Henry Scrope, 9th Baron Scrope of Bolton; and Jane Howard, who married Charles Neville, 6th Earl of Westmorland. In 1548, after Surrey's execution, his children were placed in the care of their aunt, Mary Howard who appointed the martyrologist, John Foxe, as their tutor.
Lady Mary Howard (1519–1557), who married, on 28 November 1533, King Henry VIII's illegitimate son, Henry FitzRoy (1519–1536), by whom she had no issue.
Thomas Howard, 1st Viscount Howard of Bindon (1520–1582), who married firstly Elizabeth Marney, secondly Gertrude Lyte, thirdly Mabel Burton, and fourthly Margaret Manning.
Lady Muriel Howard (died young).
Lady Katherine Howard, who by 9 December 1529 married, as his first wife, Edward Stanley, 3rd Earl of Derby (1509–1572), and died 15 March 1530. Derby later married, as his second wife, Katherine's aunt, Dorothy Howard.

Death and burial
The Duke died at Kenninghall on 25 August 1554 and was buried at St. Michael's Church at Framlingham in Suffolk. He was succeeded as head of the dukedom and as Earl Marshal by his grandson, Thomas Howard, 4th Duke of Norfolk.

Fictional portrayals
Norfolk has been portrayed several times in film. In The Private Life of Henry VIII (1933) he was played by Frederick Culley. In The Prince and the Pauper (1937) he was played by Henry Stephenson. In A Man for All Seasons (1966), he was played by Nigel Davenport. In Anne of the Thousand Days (1969), Peter Jeffrey took the role. He went on to reprise the role in a 1996 BBC adaptation of Mark Twain's 1881 novel The Prince and the Pauper.In the 1970 BBC miniseries The Six Wives of Henry VIII, the role was played by Patrick Troughton. In the 1973 film, based on the miniseries, he was played by Michael Gough. Sir Rex Harrison portrayed him in the 1977 adaptation of the same novel called The Prince and the Pauper. Christopher Eccleston played Norfolk in the 1998 film Elizabeth. Mark Strong portrayed Norfolk in the 2003 ITV feature Henry VIII. In the Showtime series The Tudors (2007), he was played by Henry Czerny. David Morrissey played the Duke in the film The Other Boleyn Girl. Bernard Hill played the Duke in the acclaimed 2015 BBC adaptation of Hilary Mantel's Wolf Hall.

D. L. Bogdan's novels Rivals in the Tudor Court and Secrets of the Tudor Court (published in the UK under the name of Darcey Bonnette) feature Norfolk as one of the central characters. Norfolk is also one of the characters in the Philippa Gregory novels The Other Boleyn Girl and The Boleyn Inheritance. He is an important character in The Man on a Donkey by H.F.M. Prescott and The Fifth Queen by Ford Madox Ford, and a prominent antagonist in Hilary Mantel's Wolf Hall, Bring Up the Bodies, and The Mirror & the Light.

Family tree

Footnotes

References

 
 

 
 
 

 Head, David M. Ebbs & Flows of Fortune: The Life of Thomas Howard, Third Duke of Norfolk (1995) 360pp.

Attribution

Further reading

External links
 

1473 births
1554 deaths
Lord High Stewards
Lord High Treasurers of England
Earls Marshal
Lord High Admirals of England
303
Thomas Howard, 03rd Duke of Norfolk
302
Barons Mowbray
15
Knights of the Garter
Male Shakespearean characters
Surrey, Thomas Howard, Earl of
Prisoners in the Tower of London
15th-century English nobility
16th-century English nobility
16th-century English politicians
16th-century Royal Navy personnel
Burials in Suffolk
Lords Lieutenant of Ireland